2010 Auckland Open was a darts tournament that took place in Auckland, New Zealand on 18 September 2010.

Results

Men

Women

References

2010 in darts
2010 in New Zealand sport
Darts in New Zealand
September 2010 sports events in New Zealand